Joe Richardson (17 March 1942–1966) was an English professional footballer who played as an inside forward.

Career
Born in Sheffield, Richardson played for Rochdale, appearing in the second leg of the 1962 Football League Cup Final. He scored a brace of goals in the 3–1 defeat of Blackburn Rovers that helped Dale to the final of that competition.

Death
Richardson died tragically in 1966 while working as a lorry driver.

References

1942 births
1966 deaths
English footballers
Footballers from Sheffield
Birmingham City F.C. players
Rochdale A.F.C. players
Sheffield United F.C. players
English Football League players
Association football midfielders
Date of death missing
Road incident deaths in the United Kingdom